Tsugni is a rural locality (a selo) and the administrative centre of Tsugninsky Selsoviet, Akushinsky District, Republic of Dagestan, Russia. The population was 748 as of 2010. There are 15 streets.

Geography 
Tsugni is located 31 km south of Akusha (the district's administrative centre) by road, on the Tsugnikherk River. Gulebki is the nearest rural locality.

References 

Rural localities in Akushinsky District